More Love Songs is a 1986 album by Loudon Wainwright III released on Rounder Records. Wainwright had moved to England, and this was the second album produced by (and featuring) Richard Thompson. Critically and popularly it is probably considered the peak of his 1980s renaissance. After three albums in four years, it would be another three years before he released the largely ignored Therapy. The album was nominated for the "Best Contemporary Folk Recording" Grammy.

The style of the album combines purely acoustic staples like "Your Mother and I" with piano-driven ballads like "The Back Nine" and full-blown rockers like "Vampire Blues" and "Hard Day on the Planet". Wainwright also careens emotionally from the sad "Overseas Call" to the laugh-out-loud "Synchronicity".

Wainwright also enjoyed a period of popularity as a regular on The Jasper Carrott Show in the UK, and many of the songs from his following album were written during his time living in the UK as well as some (still) unreleased songs. By the late 1980s, Wainwright returned back to the USA.

Track listing 
 "Hard Day on the Planet"  – 4:48
 "Synchronicity"  – 3:20
 "Your Mother and I"  – 2:33
 "I Eat Out"  – 1:53
 "No"  – 3:42
 "The Home Stretch"  – 3:48
 "The Acid Song"  – 4:33 (not included on the LP version)
 "Unhappy Anniversary"  – 2:54
 "Man's World"  – 5:28
 "Vampire Blues"  – 2:55
 "Overseas Call"  – 4:04
 "Expatriate"  – 2:17
 "The Back Nine"  – 4:04

Personnel 
 Loudon Wainwright III - guitar, percussion, vocals
 Arran Ahmun - percussion
 Martin Brinsford - percussion
 Martin Carthy - guitar, mandolin, vocals
 Richard Cheetham - trombone
 Howard Evans - trumpet
 Peter Filleul - keyboards
 Christopher Guest - synthesizer
 John Kirkpatrick - accordion, vocals
 Dave Mattacks - drums
 Ruari McFarlane - bass
 Brian McNeill - fiddle
 Alan Reid - synthesizer
 Chaim Tannenbaum - banjo, harmonica, saxophone, vocals
 Danny Thompson - bass
 Richard Thompson - guitar, mandolin, vocals
 Beckie Burns, Christine Collister, Maria Muldaur, Linda Taylor - additional vocals

Produced by Richard Thompson, Chaim Tannenbaum, Paul Charles and Loudon Wainwright III.

Release history 
 LP: Rounder 3106 (U.S.)
 LP: Demon FIEND79 (UK)
 CD: Rounder 3106
 CD: Demon FIENDCD79 (UK)

References

Loudon Wainwright III albums
1986 albums
Rounder Records albums